Halle Hilton (born 10 June 2004) is a British artistic gymnast who represents Ireland in international competition. A former British junior national team member, she participated in the 2018 European Women's Artistic Gymnastics Championships where she won a bronze in the team competition. After switching allegiance to Ireland, she competed at the 2022 European Women's Artistic Gymnastics Championships where she placed thirty-eighth in the all-around competition.

References

External links
 

Living people
2004 births
Irish female artistic gymnasts
British female artistic gymnasts
Sportspeople from Essex
Sportspeople from Ipswich